Tomáš Cigánek (born 30 November 1978, in Přerov) is a Czech footballer (midfielder) who plays for SK Kladno.

External links
 Player profile 

1978 births
Living people
Sportspeople from Přerov
Czech footballers
Czech First League players
SK Kladno players
Association football midfielders
FK Mladá Boleslav players